James Durkin may refer to:
 James Durkin (actor) (1879–1934), Canadian-born American actor and director
 Jim Durkin (James B. Durkin, born 1961), member of the Illinois House of Representatives